Full Circle is the third serial of the 18th season of the British science fiction television series Doctor Who, which was first broadcast in four weekly parts on BBC1 from 25 October to 15 November 1980.

The serial involves the alien time traveller the Fourth Doctor (Tom Baker) discovering the life cycle of three closely related species on the planet Alzarius—the humanoid Alzarians, the Marshmen, and the Marshspiders—coming "full circle". Full Circle is the first of three loosely connected serials set in another universe to the Doctor's own known as E-Space and introduces Matthew Waterhouse as the companion Adric.

Plot
En route to Gallifrey, the TARDIS passes through a strange phenomenon and ends up in an alternative universe called E-Space, where a small but sustainable civilisation of humanoids called Alzarians live between a river and a grounded spaceship, Starliner. It is an oligarchy ruled by three senior colonists known as Deciders. A sudden series of irregular events are interpreted by Decider Draith as a bad omen and the colonists move into the Starliner to protect themselves. One of the younger colonists, Adric, watches Draith drown in the river. His last words are "Tell Dexeter we've come full circle!" Adric heads into the forest in panic, finding the TARDIS, where the Doctor and Romana take him in.

The other Deciders order the Starliner sealed and select a new Decider. Humanoid Marshmen and scuttling Marshspiders begin to appear. The Doctor gains entry to the Starliner, followed by a Marshchild. Both are found and taken to the Three Deciders. The Doctor is appalled when chief scientist Dexeter starts to perform vivisection experiments on the Marshchild.

Romana is bitten by a Marshspider and starts to change, seemingly possessed. The Doctor uses a protein serum to cure her and they determine the ship has been maintained for 40,000 generations by a species that has three aspects: spiders, Marshmen, and Alzarians. They are all the same species and thus have come "full circle."

It is accidentally deduced that oxygen in its pure form is toxic to the Marshmen and this non-lethal defence is used to force the Marshmen out of the Starliner. During their retreat, Adric stows away in the TARDIS as his fellow colonists pilot the craft away from Alzarius.

Production

The story was repeated on BBC1 (except BBC1 Wales) across four consecutive evenings from Monday to Thursday, 3–6 August 1981, achieving viewing figures of 4.9, 4.2, 4.6 and 6.4 million viewers respectively.

Working titles for this story included The Planet That Slept. At the time of writing this story, Andrew Smith was a seventeen-year-old who achieved his lifelong ambition to write for the show.

The exterior locations for Alzarius were filmed at Black Park in Buckinghamshire.

Commercial releases

In print

A novelisation of this serial, written by Andrew Smith, was published by Target Books in September 1982. The novelisation opens with the Starliner crashing on Alzarius. An audiobook of the Target novelisation was released on 29 January 2015 read by Matthew Waterhouse and John Leeson.

Home media
Full Circle was released on VHS in October 1997. The DVD was released in January 2009 as part of a boxed set called The E-Space Trilogy. This serial was also released as part of the Doctor Who DVD Files (issue 85) in April 2012. Paddy Kingsland's incidental music for the serial was released as part of the compilation album Doctor Who at the BBC Radiophonic Workshop Volume 4: Meglos & Full Circle in 2002. In 2019, the story was released on Blu-ray as part of the Doctor Who Collection Season 18 box set.

Academic Studies 
A book on the serial, written by New Zealand academic John Toon, was released by Obverse Books in January 2018 as part of its Black Archive series.  It won the Sir Julius Vogel Award in the category of Best Professional Production/Publication in 2019.

References

External links

Target novelisation

Fourth Doctor serials
1980 British television episodes